Ullugatag is a rural locality (a selo) and the administrative centre of Ullugatagsky Selsoviet, Suleyman-Stalsky District, Republic of Dagestan, Russia. The population was 636 as of 2010. There are 4 streets.

Geography 
Ullugatag is located 11 km south of Kasumkent (the district's administrative centre) by road. Saytarkent is the nearest rural locality.

References 

Rural localities in Suleyman-Stalsky District